Walnut Hill, located in Medford, Massachusetts, is the geographical home of Tufts University. Walnut Hill itself later became known as College Hill due to the dominant presence of the University.

References 

Tufts University
Medford, Massachusetts